The Edmonton Valley Zoo (sometimes known simply as the Valley Zoo) is a zoo located in Edmonton, Alberta's river valley. The Edmonton Valley Zoo is owned and operated by the City of Edmonton and is open 364 days a year, closing only on Christmas. The zoo is currently accredited by Canada's Accredited Zoos and Aquariums and is one of three accredited zoos in Alberta.

History
The Valley Zoo opened on July 1, 1959, as a replacement for a previous Edmonton Zoo (Borden Park Zoo) which was torn down to expand Northlands Park (now Northlands). The zoo is home to over 350 exotic and native animals and houses over 100 different species. In 2007, the Edmonton Valley Zoo launched the Makira Conservation Fund Initiative in honour of their newly unveiled lemur habitat, named the Makira Outpost after the Makira forest region in Madagascar. In addition to this cause, the zoo also raises funds and awareness for other endangered animals such as red pandas, through the Red Panda Network, and various other conservation efforts. This facility also promotes animal conservation through its participation in the Species Survival Plan, an international effort led by the American Zoo and Aquarium Association which aims to restore endangered animal populations to the wild, for a variety of species. They have raised six red panda cubs since 2007.

The Edmonton Valley Zoo's 2005 Master Plan was approved by Edmonton City Council, allocating $50 million in capital funding. With the first project, Arctic Shores  completed, the second phase, The Wander Trail, opened in 2013.

Exhibits

Inner Zoo 
The Inner Zoo is the area of the zoo that was originally the Storyland Valley Zoo. The vast majority of the area was constructed in 1959. Animals that live within this area of the zoo during summer include: emus, laughing kookaburras, keas, black swans, and striped skunks

Makira Outpost 
Makira Outpost is an exhibit which opened in the summer of 2007 and is home to the zoo's lemurs. The exhibit uses many exhibit methods. The lemurs have access to a large outdoor island with two large elm trees for climbing. It also has two outdoor enclosures that have zoomesh (a nearly invisible mesh). The indoor enclosures are huge and benefit from plentiful natural light. The animals housed in Makira outpost include: ring-tailed lemurs, African spurred tortoise and black-and-white ruffed lemurs.

Nature's Wild Backyard 
In 2019 the zoo opened phase one of Nature's Wild Backyard. Phase one includes an immersive exhibit for the zoo's red panda as well as the year-round Urban Farm, home to numerous domestic species. In addition to the animal enclosures the Urban Farm has a restaurant, washrooms, and ice cream stand. Phase II of Nature's Wild Backyard is not completely funded.

Carnivore Alley 
The Carnivore Alley has the majority of the zoo's carnivores, such as red foxes, snow leopards, Amur tigers, Arctic wolves, Canada lynx and serval.

Elephant House and Exhibit 
The Valley Zoo's Elephant House is home to Lucy, a female Asian elephant who was orphaned in Sri Lanka in 1975 and came to the zoo at the age of two on May 19, 1977. The elephant house is currently closed due to Lucy's aging condition and Covid-19.

Saito Centre  
The Saito Centre is named after the zoo's former veterinarian who died shortly before construction of the building. Originally designed as a winter holding building, it now houses all the zoo's fragile animals. It is winter home to all the zoo's primate species as well. It is also home to the reptile and nocturnal wing, froggery (over ten species of amphibians), and many of the zoo's smaller animals. In 2017 an indoor exhibit that houses temporary animal exhibits was created.

African Veldt 
The African Veldt is home to non-releasable American white pelicans and endangered Grévy's zebras.

Polar Extremes: Arctic Shores
The Arctic Shores replicates an Arctic coast. Harbour seals and northern fur seals can be viewed swimming underwater.

Back Paddocks 
The back paddocks are home to the zoos larger hoof stock and include Bactrian camel, reindeers, guanacos, bighorn sheep, and a Sichuan takin group.

Birds of Prey 
The Birds of Prey area features "non-releasable" raptors, some of which are in outreach programs. Some species include bald eagle, peregrine falcon, and snowy owl.

Controversy

The residence of Lucy the elephant at the Valley Zoo has been controversial since 2009. Animal welfare groups such as Zoocheck opposed keeping a lone elephant in a zoo, since elephants are a highly social species, and that Edmonton's cold climate is unhealthy for elephants. Groups like Zoocheck have said that Lucy exhibits psychological health issues, including lethargy and abnormal stereotypical behaviours. On page 4 of this report Zoocheck Canada conducted a behavioral study in 2007, which found Lucy to be lethargic, and exhibiting pronounced stereotypic behaviors, such as abnormal swaying and rocking.

A number of North American zoos have phased out elephants, including the Toronto zoo when it moved three elephants in October 2013 to the United States.

The Edmonton Valley Zoo argues that moving Lucy would be detrimental to her health, disclosing a known respiratory issue that is purportedly exacerbated by stress.

Retired game show host and animal rights activist Bob Barker also advocated for Lucy's transfer.

In February 2021 the Jane Goodall Institute of Canada, based on an independent third-party review of Lucy's case, released a statement consistent with previous assessments that "...the risks of moving Lucy outweigh the potential benefits to her.”

Gallery

References

External links 

1959 establishments in Alberta
Buildings and structures in Edmonton
Tourist attractions in Edmonton
Zoos in Alberta
Zoos established in 1959